Les Diablons are a mountain of the Swiss Pennine Alps, overlooking Zinal in the canton of Valais. They lie between the valleys of Anniviers and Turtmann  on the subrange of the Pennine Alps that culminates at the Weisshorn.

South of Les Diablons, on the Tracuit pass, is located the Tracuit Hut.

See also
List of mountains of Switzerland

References

External links
 Les Diablons on Hikr

Mountains of the Alps
Alpine three-thousanders
Mountains of Switzerland
Mountains of Valais